Washburn is an unincorporated town and census-designated place (CDP) in Black Hawk County, Iowa, United States. Washburn lies south of Waterloo on U.S. Route 218. Other towns near Washburn are Gilbertville and La Porte City. The community is part of the Waterloo–Cedar Falls Metropolitan Statistical Area.

Demographics

History
Washburn was platted in 1880. Washburn's population was 79 in 1902, and 94 in 1925.

The 2010 census recorded a population of 876 for the Washburn CDP.

Education
Washburn is in the Waterloo Community School District. It is currently serviced by Orange Elementary, Hoover Middle, and Waterloo West High.

References

Waterloo – Cedar Falls metropolitan area
Census-designated places in Black Hawk County, Iowa
Census-designated places in Iowa
1880 establishments in Iowa
Populated places established in 1880